This article lists the results for the Japan national football team between 1980 and 1989.

1980

1981

1982

1983

1984

1985

1986

1987

1988

1989

References 

Japan national football team results
1980s in Japanese sport